The SETCA LLP Petrel was a tourism aircraft built in France in the late 1930s by Société d'Études Techniques et de Constructions Aéronautiques (SETCA).

Specifications (LLP)

References

1930s French aircraft